Culture Clash is the Harare Jit band, led by ex-Bhundu Boys guitarist/vocalist Rise Kagona and Champion Doug Veitch (guitar, vocals), who is credited with bringing the Bhundu Boys to the attention of British audiences. The band is based in Edinburgh, and has performed throughout the UK.

Although Kagona and Veitch are the listed band members, the line-up also includes drums and bass guitar.

External links
 Agent's page
 Culture Clash on MySpace

British world music groups